The 1998 Qatar Open, known as the 1998 Qatar Mobil Open, for sponsorship reasons,  was a men's tennis tournament played on outdoor hard courts in Doha, Qatar that was part of the World Series of the 1998 ATP Tour. The tournament was held from 5 January through 12 January 1998. Third-seeded Petr Korda won the singles title.

Finals

Singles

 Petr Korda defeated  Fabrice Santoro, 6–0, 6–3.
 It was Korda's 1st title of the year and the 19th of his career.

Doubles

 Mahesh Bhupathi /  Leander Paes defeated  Olivier Delaître /  Fabrice Santoro, 6–4, 3–6, 6–4.
 It was Bhupathi's 1st title of the year and the 7th of his career. It was Paes's 1st title of the year and the 7th of his career.

References

External links
 ATP Singles draw
 ATP Doubles draw

 
Qatar Open
Qatar Open (tennis)
1998 in Qatari sport